Aiyang Tlang is a mountain on the Bangladesh–Myanmar border. In 2020, Aiyang Tlang Hill was confirmed to be the highest point in Bangladesh. The hill was discovered in the 1980s by Van Rausang Bawm of the local Bawm ethnic community. On 13 November 2019, Engineer Jyotirmoy Dhar became the first Bangladeshi to climb the mountain.
 
In November 2019, the height of Aiyang Tlang was measured by GPS (Global positioning system) and it was 3298 feet high above sea level.

See also
 Geography of Bangladesh
 Geography of Myanmar
 List of mountains of Bangladesh

References 

Mountains of Myanmar
Bangladesh–Myanmar border
Mountains of Bangladesh
International mountains of Asia